Cho Young-shin (born 20 October 1967) is a South Korean handball coach of the Korean national team. He competed in the men's tournament at the 1992 Summer Olympics.

At the 2012 Summer Olympics, he coached the South Korea national handball team.
He has two children, who both attend college in the United States.

References

Living people
1967 births
South Korean handball coaches
Asian Games medalists in handball
Handball players at the 1990 Asian Games
Handball players at the 1994 Asian Games
Asian Games gold medalists for South Korea
Medalists at the 1990 Asian Games
Medalists at the 1994 Asian Games
Handball coaches of international teams
Olympic handball players of South Korea
Handball players at the 1992 Summer Olympics